Chad Michael Kuhl (born September 10, 1992) is an American professional baseball pitcher in the Washington Nationals organization. He has played in Major League Baseball (MLB) for the Pittsburgh Pirates and Colorado Rockies.

High school and college
Kuhl attended Middletown High School in Middletown, Delaware, where he pitched and played first base for the school's baseball team. He was named to the All-Delaware team in 2010. He then enrolled at University of Delaware, where he continued his baseball career.

Career

Pittsburgh Pirates
After completing his junior season of college baseball at the University of Delaware, he was drafted by the Pittsburgh Pirates in the ninth round of the 2013 Major League Baseball draft.

After signing, he made his professional debut with the Jamestown Jammers and spent all of 2013 there, going 3-4 with a 2.11 ERA in 13 starts. Kuhl pitched 2014 with the Bradenton Marauders, compiling a 13-5 record and 3.46 ERA in 28 starts, and 2015 with the Altoona Curve where he was 11-5 with a 2.48 ERA and 1.14 WHIP in 26 starts. He began 2016 with the Indianapolis Indians.

Kuhl was recalled from Indianapolis on June 26, 2016, made his major league debut, and got his first win that same night as the Pirates defeated the Los Angeles Dodgers, 4–3. Kuhl pitched five innings, allowing three runs, four hits, and four walks with five strikeouts in his debut. He was optioned to Indianapolis on July 16 and recalled on August 9. After his August 9 recall, he spent the remainder of the season with Pittsburgh. In 14 starts for the Pirates he was 5-4 with a 4.20 ERA, and in 16 starts for Indianapolis he pitched to a 6-3 record and 2.37 ERA.

Kuhl spent all of the 2017 season in the Pirates starting rotation. Kuhl started 31 games, posting an 8-11 record with an ERA of 4.35. On June 30, 2018, Kuhl was placed on the disabled list with a right forearm strain. He was ruled out for the season at the beginning of September. In 16 starts, he was 5-5 with an ERA of 4.55 in 85 innings. On September 19, Kuhl underwent Tommy John surgery and missed the entire 2019 season.

In 2020, Kuhl made his return to the mound on July 27, and threw 3.2 scoreless innings in a Pirates 6-5 loss to the Milwaukee Brewers at PNC Park. He pitched to a 4.27 ERA in 46 and 1/3 innings pitched in 2020. He was also second in the National League in walks allowed. He was non-tendered on November 30, making him a free agent.

Colorado Rockies
On March 16, 2022, Kuhl signed a one-year contract with the Colorado Rockies. He threw his first-career complete game shutout on June 27, 2022 against the Dodgers. In 2022, Kuhl started 27 games for the Rockies, recording a 6-11 record and 5.72 ERA with 110 strikeouts in 137.0 innings pitched.

Washington Nationals
On February 4, 2023, Kuhl signed a minor league contract with the Washington Nationals organization.

Personal
Kuhl married former beauty queen Amanda Debus in 2019.

References

External links

1992 births
Living people
People from Bear, Delaware
Baseball players from Delaware
Major League Baseball pitchers
Pittsburgh Pirates players
Colorado Rockies players
Delaware Fightin' Blue Hens baseball players
Jamestown Jammers players
Bradenton Marauders players
Altoona Curve players
Indianapolis Indians players